Motbeg is a village in Ramshir County, Khuzestan Province, Iran.

Motbeg or Motbag or Matbag, also rendered as Motbak or Motbek or Modbag or Modbeg or Modig or Motlebek, may also refer to:
 Motbeg-e Olya, a village in Ramshir County, Khuzestan Province, Iran
 Motbeg-e Sofla, a village in Ramshir County, Khuzestan Province, Iran
 Motbeg-e Vosta, a village in Ramshir County, Khuzestan Province, Iran